North West Sydney Spirit FC is an Australian soccer club. It was the successor of the defunct Northern Spirit FC, a professional soccer club based in North Sydney, Sydney, New South Wales. Northern Spirit entered the National Soccer League in the 1998–99 season.  Its founding was inspired in part by the success Perth Glory was enjoying as a mainstream club (as opposed to the league's mainstay European migrant founded clubs), as well as an opportunity to tap into the previously unrepresented northern suburbs of Sydney.

History

Northern Spirit 
On the field, the club had early success in the National Soccer League, reaching the finals in its first attempt, but the next two seasons were not nearly as successful, the club finishing 13th in both of them. The club recovered somewhat to finish mid-table in its last 3 seasons, but only managed to make the finals once more, in 2002/03.

During Northern Spirit's first season, then Crystal Palace owner Mark Goldberg bought a 31 per cent stake in the club and secured an option for a further 35 per cent. Beset by Palace's financial problems, he relinquished his option to a group of players and coaches including Graham Arnold, Robbie Slater and Ian Crook.  The club was later owned by Rangers for a small period of time.  Rangers temporarily changed the club's home colours to their own royal blue.

Northern Spirit's home games were played at North Sydney Oval and their first league home game (against Sydney Olympic) attracted a then Australian club soccer record crowd (for a non finals match) of 18,985 a record which stood until 2005 when it was broken by Queensland Roar crowd of 20,725 (a record subsequently broken by other games). In the club's final season, Chairman Antonio Gelonesi decided to move the club to Pittwater Park, on Sydney's Northern Beaches. The decision was motivated mainly by money, with North Sydney Oval not drawing enough people to make a profit. The 23,000 capacity Brookvale Oval, a rectangular rugby league venue (home of the Manly-Warringah club) which is located roughly halfway between North Sydney Oval and Pittwater Park, was considered as a possibility for the new home but was eventually overlooked by the Spirit.

After enduring financial problems for much of its existence, the club folded after the 2003/2004 NSL season.

Formation of North West Sydney Football Ltd (Gladesville Hornsby Football Association) 
The former youth teams of Northern Spirit were assembled into the new Gladesville-Hornsby Football Association, nicknamed Spirit FC, in 2004. In 2019 GHFA merged with North West Sydney Women's Football Association to form North West Sydney Football Ltd. NWSF has its homeground at Christie Park in Macquarie Park, New South Wales. In 2007, won the NSW State League Division 1 premiership, but were not selected to be promoted. In 2008, they again won the State League Division 1 and this time were promoted to the Super League for 2009.

In 2013, Football NSW incorporated the National Premier Leagues structure to their competition. GHFA Spirit FC were selected along with 11 other teams to join the new second division of soccer in NSW.

The 2015 season saw Spirit FC crowned premiers of the NPL NSW 2, however due to NSW's promotion criteria, were not eligible.

Current Men's squad

Honours
National Premier Leagues NSW 2
Premiership (1): 2015
Waratah Cup
Winners (1): 2022
Waratah Cup
Runners-up (1): 2010

Former managers 
  Lawrie McKinna
  Graham Arnold

References

External links 
 OZ Football club profile
 NWS Spirit website

Defunct soccer clubs in Australia
Association football clubs established in 1997
Association football clubs disestablished in 2004
National Soccer League (Australia) teams
Soccer clubs in Sydney
National Premier Leagues clubs
1997 establishments in Australia
2004 disestablishments in Australia